The 2021 BCL Americas Final was the final game of the 2021 BCL Americas, the 2nd season of the league under its new entity and the 14th of the pan-American premier basketball league organised by FIBA. It was played at the Alexis Arguello Sports Complex in Managua on 14 April 2021. The game was played between Nicaraguan club Real Estelí and Brazilian club Flamengo.

Flamengo won the final and captured its second pan-American championship, thus also qualifying for the 2022 FIBA Intercontinental Cup.

Teams
In the following table, finals until 2020 were in the FIBA Americas League era.

Road to the final

(H): Home game
(A): Away game
(N): Neutral venue

Game details

References

External links

2021
International sports competitions hosted by Nicaragua
Sport in Managua
2020–21 in South American basketball